İsmail Cem Kurtar (born May 21, 1982 in Bursa) is a Turkish volleyball player. He is 194 cm and plays as outside hitter. He has been playing for Galatasaray Yurtiçi Kargo and wears the number 7. He played 84 times for the national team and also played for Fenerbahçe SK, İstanbul B.Şehir Bld. SK, Erdemirspor, Çankaya Belediyespor

Honours and awards
 2008-09 Turkish Men's Volleyball League Champion with İstanbul B.Şehir Bld.
 2009-10 Turkish Men's Volleyball League Champion with Fenerbahçe SK
 2010-11 Turkish Men's Volleyball League Champion with Fenerbahçe SK
 2007 Summer Universiade Champion
 2008-09 CEV Balkan CUP Champion
 2009-10 CEV Balkan CUP Champion
 2000 ISF World 2nd place
 2008 CEV European League 3rd place

References

,

1982 births
Living people
Sportspeople from Bursa
Turkish men's volleyball players
Fenerbahçe volleyballers
Galatasaray S.K. (men's volleyball) players
Universiade medalists in volleyball
Universiade gold medalists for Turkey
21st-century Turkish people